Pisanodon is an extinct genus of South American toxodont. The genus contains the single species Pisanodon nazari.

References 

Toxodonts
Prehistoric placental genera
Fossil taxa described in 1972